The Österreichische Basketball Bundesliga (ÖBL) Coach of the Year is an award given to the best coach in the Österreichische Basketball Bundesliga, the highest professional basketball league in Austria.

Winners

Awards won by nationality

Awards won by club

References
'''General

Coach of the Year